Sanming Shaxian Airport  is an airport serving the city of Sanming in Fujian Province, China. It is located in Fenggang Subdistrict of Shaxian District. The airport was opened on 7 March 2016.

History
Construction of Sanming Airport was first approved by the national government in 1993 and began in 1995, but stopped in 1998 in the wake of the 1997 Asian financial crisis after 160 million yuan was already spent. Construction resumed in 2005 with private investment, and the airport was declared the first privately owned airport in China, but soon stopped again for undisclosed reasons. In 2009, construction started for the third time, back with government funding worth 1.447 billion yuan. The airport was opened on 7 March 2016.

Facilities
It is designed to handle 430,000 passengers annually by 2020.

Airlines and destinations

See also
List of airports in China
List of the busiest airports in China

References

Airports in Fujian
Airports established in 2016
Sanming
2016 establishments in China